Szymon Gąsiński (born July 8, 1983 in Łódź) is a Polish footballer who plays for ŁKS Łódź. He is also on the Poland national beach soccer team.

Career

Club
In January 2011, he joined Cracovia on a two-year contract.

References

External links
 

1983 births
Living people
Polish footballers
Polish beach soccer players
Beach soccer goalkeepers
Zagłębie Sosnowiec players
Polonia Bytom players
MKS Cracovia (football) players
Association football goalkeepers
Footballers from Łódź
Expatriate footballers in Norway